The Extremely Large Telescope (ELT) is an astronomical observatory currently under construction. When completed, it will be the world's largest optical/near-infrared extremely large telescope. Part of the European Southern Observatory (ESO) agency, it is located on top of Cerro Armazones in the Atacama Desert of northern Chile. 

The design consists of a reflecting telescope with a  segmented primary mirror and a  diameter secondary mirror, and will be supported by adaptive optics, eight laser guide star units and multiple large science instruments. The observatory's design will gather 100 million times more light than the human eye, equivalent to about 10 times more light than the largest  optical telescopes existing as of 2023, and will correct for atmospheric distortion. It has around 250 times the light gathering area of the Hubble Space Telescope and, according to the ELT's specifications, would provide images 16 times sharper than those from Hubble. 

The project was originally called the European Extremely Large Telescope (E-ELT), but the name was shortened in 2017. The ELT is intended to advance astrophysical knowledge by enabling detailed studies of planets around other stars, the first galaxies in the Universe, supermassive black holes, and the nature of the Universe's dark sector, and to detect water and organic molecules in protoplanetary disks around other stars. As planned in 2011, the facility was expected to take 11 years to construct, from 2014 to 2025.

On 11 June 2012, the ESO Council approved the ELT programme's plans to begin civil works at the telescope site, with construction of the telescope itself pending final agreement with governments of some member states. Construction work on the ELT site started in June 2014. By December 2014, ESO had secured over 90% of the total funding and authorized construction of the telescope to start, which will cost around one billion euros for the first construction phase. The first stone of the telescope was ceremonially laid on 26 May 2017, initiating the construction of the dome's main structure and telescope. , first light is planned for 2028.

History 

On 26 April 2010, the European Southern Observatory (ESO) Council selected Cerro Armazones, Chile, as the baseline site for the planned ELT. Other sites that were under discussion included Cerro Macon, Salta, in Argentina; Roque de los Muchachos Observatory, on the Canary Islands; and sites in North Africa, Morocco, and Antarctica.

However, in 2011 a proposal was put forward to reduce overall size by 13% to 978 m2, with a  diameter primary mirror and a  diameter secondary mirror. This reduced projected costs from 1.275 billion to 1.055 billion euros and should allow the telescope to be finished sooner. The smaller secondary is a particularly important change;  places it within the capabilities of multiple manufacturers, and the lighter mirror unit avoids the need for high-strength materials in the secondary mirror support spider.

ESO's Director General commented in a 2011 press release that "With the new E-ELT design we can still satisfy the bold science goals and also ensure that the construction can be completed in only 10–11 years." The ESO Council endorsed the revised baseline design in June 2011 and expected a construction proposal for approval in December 2011. Funding was subsequently included in the 2012 budget for initial work to begin in early 2012. The project received preliminary approval in June 2012. ESO approved the start of construction in December 2014, with over 90% funding of the nominal budget secured.

The design phase of the 5-mirror anastigmat was fully funded within the ESO budget. With the 2011 changes in the baseline design (such as a reduction in the size of the primary mirror from 42 m to 39.3 m), in 2017 the construction cost was estimated to be €1.15 billion (including first generation instruments). In 2014, the start of operations was planned for 2024.

Planning 

ESO focused on the current design after a feasibility study concluded the proposed  diameter, Overwhelmingly Large Telescope, would cost €1.5 billion (£1 billion), and be too complex. The ELT uses a similar design, as well as techniques to work around atmospheric distortion of incoming light, known as adaptive optics.

A 40-metre-class mirror will allow the study of the atmospheres of extrasolar planets. The ELT is the highest priority in the European planning activities for research infrastructures, such as the Astronet Science Vision and Infrastructure Roadmap and the ESFRI Roadmap. The telescope underwent a Phase B study in 2014 that included "contracts with industry to design and manufacture prototypes of key elements like the primary mirror segments, the adaptive fourth mirror or the mechanical structure (...) [and] concept studies for eight instruments".

Design 
The ELT will use a novel design with a total of five mirrors. The first three mirrors are curved (non-spherical), and form a three-mirror anastigmat design for excellent image quality over the 10 arcminute field of view (one third of the width of the full Moon). The fourth and fifth mirrors are (almost) flat, and respectively  provide adaptive optics correction for atmospheric distortions (mirror 4) and tip-tilt correction for image stabilisation (mirror 5). The fourth and fifth mirrors also send the light sideways to one of two Nasmyth focal stations at either side of the telescope structure, allowing multiple large instruments to be mounted simultaneously.

ELT mirror and sensors contracts

Primary mirror 

The 39-metre primary mirror will be composed of 798 hexagonal segments, each approximately 1.4 metres across and with 50 mm thickness. Two segments will be re-coated and replaced each working day, to keep the mirror always clean and highly reflective.

Edge sensors constantly measure the positions of the primary mirror segments relative to their immediate neighbours. 2394 position actuators (3 for each segment) use this information to adjust the system, keeping the overall surface shape unchanged against deformations caused by external factors such as wind, gravity, temperature changes and vibrations.

In January 2017, ESO awarded the contract for the fabrication of the 4608 edge sensors to the FAMES consortium, which is composed of Fogale and Micro-Epsilon. These sensors can measure relative positions to an accuracy of a few nanometres, the most accurate ever used in a telescope.

In May 2017, ESO awarded two additional contracts. One was awarded to Schott AG who will manufacture the blanks of the 798 segments, as well as a maintenance set of 133 additional segments. The latter allow segments to be removed, replaced, and recoated on a rotating basis once the ELT is in operation. The mirror will be cast from the same low-expansion ceramic Zerodur as the existing Very Large Telescope mirrors in Chile.

The other contract was awarded to the French company, Safran Reosc, a subsidiary of Safran Electronics & Defense. They will receive the mirror blanks from Schott, and polish one mirror segment per day to meet the 7-year deadline. During this process, each segment will be polished until it has no surface irregularity greater than 7.5 nm RMS. Afterwards, Safran Reosc will then mount, test, and complete all optical testing before delivery. This is the second largest contract for the ELT construction and the third-largest contract ESO has ever signed.

The segment support system units for the primary mirror are designed and produced by CESA (Spain) and VDL (the Netherlands). The contracts signed with ESO also include the delivery of detailed and complete instructions and engineering drawings for their production. Additionally, they include the development of the procedures required to integrate the supports with the ELT glass segments; to handle and transport the segment assemblies; and to operate and maintain them.

Secondary mirror 

Making the secondary mirror is a major challenge as it is highly convex, and aspheric.  It is also very large; at 4.2 metres in diameter and weighing 3.5 tonnes, it will be the largest secondary mirror ever employed on an optical telescope and the largest convex mirror ever produced.

In January 2017, ESO awarded a contract for the mirror blank to Schott AG, who will manufacture it of Zerodur.

Complex support cells are also necessary to ensure the flexible secondary and tertiary mirrors retain their correct shape and position; these support cells will be provided by SENER.

The pre-formed glass-ceramic blank of the secondary mirror will then be polished, and tested by Safran Reosc. The mirror will be shaped and polished to a precision of 15 nanometres (15 millionths of a millimetre) over the optical surface.

Tertiary mirror 
The 3.8-metre concave tertiary mirror, also cast from Zerodur, will be an unusual feature of the telescope. Most current large telescopes, including the VLT and the NASA/ESA Hubble Space Telescope, use just two curved mirrors to form an image. In these cases, a small, flat tertiary mirror is sometimes introduced to divert the light to a convenient focus. However, in the ELT the tertiary mirror also has a curved surface, as the use of three mirrors delivers a better final image quality over a larger field of view than would be possible with a two-mirror design.

Quaternary mirror 
 
The 2.4-metre quaternary mirror is a flat adaptive mirror, and only 2 millimetres thick. With up to 8000 actuators, the surface can be readjusted at very high time frequencies. The deformable mirror will be the largest adaptive mirror ever made, and consists of six component petals, control systems, and voice-coil actuators. The image distortion caused by the turbulence of the Earth's atmosphere can be corrected in real time, as well as deformations caused by the wind upon the main telescope. The ELT's adaptive optics system will provide an improvement of about a factor of 500 in the resolution, compared to the best seeing conditions achieved so far without adaptive optics.
 
The AdOptica consortium, partnered with INAF (Istituto Nazionale di Astrofisica) as subcontractors, are responsible for the design and manufacture of the quaternary mirror, which is to be shipped to Chile by the end of 2022. Safran Reosc will manufacture the mirror shells, and also polish them.

Quinary mirror 

The 2.7-metre by 2.2-metre quinary mirror is a tip-tilt mirror used to refine the image using adaptive optics. The mirror will include a fast tip-tilt system for image stabilization that will compensate perturbations caused by wind, atmospheric turbulence, and the telescope itself before reaching the ELT instruments.

ELT dome and structure

Dome construction 

The ELT dome will have a height of nearly 74 metres from the ground and a diameter of 86 metres, making it the largest dome ever built for a telescope.  The dome will have a total mass of around 6100 tonnes, and the telescope mounting and tube structure will have a total moving mass of around 3700 tonnes.

For the observing slit, two main designs were under study: one with two sets of nested doors, and the current baseline design, i.e. a single pair of large sliding doors. This pair of doors has a total width of 45.3 m.

ESO signed a contract for its construction, together with the main structure of the telescopes, with the Italian ACe Consortium, consisting of Astaldi and Cimolai and the nominated subcontractor, Italy's EIE Group. The signature ceremony took place on 25 May 2016 at ESO's Headquarters in Garching bei München, Germany.

The dome is to provide needed protection to the telescope in inclement weather and during the day. A number of concepts for the dome were evaluated. The baseline concept for the 40m-class ELT dome is a nearly hemispherical dome, rotating atop a concrete pier, with curved laterally-opening doors. This is a re-optimisation from the previous design, aimed at reducing the costs, and it is being revalidated to be ready for construction.

One year after signing the contract, and after the laying of the first stone ceremony in May 2017, the site was handed over to ACe, signifying the beginning of the construction of the dome's main structure.

Astronomical performance 
In terms of astronomical performance the dome is required to be able to track about the 1-degree zenithal avoidance locus as well as preset to a new target within 5 minutes. This requires the dome to be able to accelerate and move at angular speeds of 2 degrees/s (the linear speed is approximately 5 km/h).

The dome is designed to allow complete freedom to the telescope so that it can position itself whether it is opened or closed. It will also permit observations from the zenith down to 20 degrees from the horizon.

Windscreen 
With such a large opening, the ELT dome requires the presence of a windscreen to protect the telescope's mirrors (apart from the secondary), from direct exposure to the wind. The baseline design of the windscreen minimises the volume required to house it. Two spherical blades, either side of the observing slit doors, slide in front of the telescope aperture to restrict the wind.

Ventilation and air-conditioning 
The dome design ensures that the dome provides sufficient ventilation for the telescope not to be limited by dome seeing. For this the dome is also equipped with louvers, whereby the windscreen is designed to allow them to fulfill their function.

Computational fluid dynamic simulations and wind tunnel work are being carried out to study the airflow in and around the dome, as well as the effectiveness of the dome and windscreen in protecting the telescope.

Besides being designed for water-tightness, air-tightness is also one of the requirements as it is critical to minimise the air-conditioning load. The air-conditioning of the dome is necessary not only to thermally prepare the telescope for the forthcoming night but also in order to keep the telescope optics clean.

The air-conditioning of the telescope during the day is critical and the current specifications permit the dome to cool the telescope and internal volume by 10 °C over 12 hours.

Science goals 

The ELT will search for extrasolar planets—planets orbiting other stars. This will include not only the discovery of planets down to Earth-like masses through indirect measurements of the wobbling motion of stars perturbed by the planets that orbit them, but also the direct imaging of larger planets and possibly even the characterisation of their atmospheres. The telescope will attempt to image Earthlike exoplanets, which may be possible.

Furthermore, the ELT's suite of instruments will allow astronomers to probe the earliest stages of the formation of planetary systems and to detect water and organic molecules in protoplanetary discs around stars in the making. Thus, the ELT will answer fundamental questions regarding planet formation and evolution.

By probing the most distant objects the ELT will provide clues to understanding the formation of the first objects that formed: primordial stars, primordial galaxies and black holes and their relationships. Studies of extreme objects like black holes will benefit from the power of the ELT to gain more insight into time-dependent phenomena linked with the various processes at play around compact objects.

The ELT is designed to make detailed studies of the first galaxies. Observations of these early galaxies with the ELT will give clues that will help understand how these objects form and evolve. In addition, the ELT will be a unique tool for making an inventory of the changing content of the various elements in the Universe with time, and to understand star formation history in galaxies.

One of the goals of the ELT is the possibility of making a direct measurement of the acceleration of the Universe's expansion. Such a measurement would have a major impact on our understanding of the Universe. The ELT will also search for possible variations in the fundamental physical constants with time. An unambiguous detection of such variations would have far-reaching consequences for our comprehension of the general laws of physics.

Instrumentation 

The telescope will have several science instruments and will be able to switch from one instrument to another within minutes. The telescope and dome will also be able to change positions on the sky and start a new observation in a very short time.

Four of its instruments, the first generation, will be available at or shortly after first light, while two others will begin operations at a later stage. Throughout its operation other instruments can be installed to make new use of its high resolution.

The first generation includes four instruments: MICADO, HARMONI and METIS, along with the adaptive optics system MAORY.

 HARMONI: The High Angular Resolution Monolithic Optical and Near-infrared Integral field spectrograph (HARMONI) will function as the telescope's workhorse instrument for spectroscopy.
 METIS: The Mid-infrared ELT Imager and Spectrograph (METIS) will be a mid-infrared imager and spectrograph.
MICADO: The Multi-AO (adaptive optics) Imaging Camera for Deep Observations (MICADO) will be the first dedicated imaging camera for the ELT and will work with the Multi-conjugate Adaptive Optics RelaY, (MAORY).

The second generation of instruments consists of MOSAIC and ANDES:
 MOSAIC: A proposed multi-object spectrograph which will allow astronomers to trace the growth of galaxies and the distribution of matter from shortly after the Big Bang to the present day.
 ANDES (formerly HIRES): The ArmazoNes high Dispersion Echelle Spectrograph will be used to search for indications of life on Earth-like exoplanets, find the first-born stars of the universe, test for possible variations of the fundamental constants of physics, and measure the acceleration of the Universe's expansion.

Comparison 

One of the largest optical telescopes operating today is the Gran Telescopio Canarias, with a 10.4 m aperture and a light-collecting area of 74 m2. Other planned extremely large telescopes include the 25 m/368 m2 Giant Magellan Telescope and 30 m/655 m2 Thirty Meter Telescope, which are also targeting the second half of the 2020 decade for completion. These two other telescopes roughly belong to the same next generation of optical ground-based telescopes. Each design is much larger than previous telescopes. 

The size of the ELT has been reduced from its original design. But even with this reduction, the ELT is significantly larger than both other planned extremely large telescopes. It has the aim of observing the universe in greater detail than the Hubble Space Telescope by taking images 15 times sharper, although it is designed to be complementary to space telescopes, which typically have very limited observing time available. The ELT's 4.2-metre secondary mirror is the same size as the primary mirror on the William Herschel Telescope, the second largest optical telescope in Europe.

The ELT under ideal conditions has an angular resolution of 0.005 arcsecond which corresponds to separating two light sources 1 AU apart from  distance, or two light sources 30 cm apart from roughly 12,000 km distance. At 0.03 arcseconds, the contrast is expected to be 108, sufficient to search for exoplanets. The unaided human eye has an angular resolution of 1 arcminute which corresponds to separating two light sources 30 cm apart from 1 km distance.

Stills 
The images below show artistic renderings of the ELT and were produced by ESO.

Video

Gallery

See also 
 Lists of telescopes
 List of largest optical reflecting telescopes
 List of optical telescopes
 Large Binocular Telescope
 European Solar Telescope (planned completion in 2025)
 Gran Telescopio Canarias
 List of astronomical observatories
 List of highest astronomical observatories
 Other observatories in Chile:
 Llano de Chajnantor Observatory 
Atacama Large Millimeter Array)
 Paranal Observatory
 Very Large Telescope
 Cerro Armazones Observatory
 La Silla Observatory
 Cerro Tololo Inter-American Observatory

References

External links 

 ESO Extremely Large Telescope
 ESO The Extremely Large Telescope ("E-ELT") Project
 Final stage for telescope design
 Green light for ELT
 Ground Telescope to Super Size
 MICADO
 METIS
 HARMONI
 Record mirror for Euro telescope BBC Online August 7 2006
 ESO Council Gives Green Light to Detailed Study of the European Extremely Large Telescope Spaceref.com

Astronomical observatories in Chile
European Southern Observatory
Buildings and structures under construction in Chile
Telescopes under construction
Articles containing video clips
Astronomy projects